Cocconeis elegans is a species of diatom. It is found in Sicily.

References 

 Sylloge algarum omnium hucusque cognitarum. Giovanni Battista de Toni, 2, 1, page 444

External links 

 

Achnanthales
Species described in 1864
Biota of Italy
Sicily